Khvorand (also Romanized as Khowrend and Khūrand; also known as Khorand and Kuran) is a village in Ravar Rural District, in the Central District of Ravar County, Kerman Province, Iran. At the 2006 census, its population was 627, in 237 families.

References 

Populated places in Ravar County